Pieter Appelmans (1373 – 16 May 1434) was one of the architects of the Cathedral of Our Lady, Antwerp, together with his father Jan Appelmans.

1373 births
1434 deaths
Burgundian Netherlands architects